The Chance of a Lifetime is a 1916 British silent sports drama film directed by Bertram Phillips and starring Queenie Thomas, Austin Camp and Fay Temple. It was based on a novel of the same title by Nat Gould.

Cast
 Queenie Thomas - Mrs. Edgar
 Austin Camp - Dick Douglas
 Fay Temple - Diana Lawson
 Harry Agar Lyons - Captain Clinch
 Frank Petley
 Rohan Clensy
 Ernest Collins
 Will Asher

References

External links

1916 films
1916 drama films
1910s English-language films
Films directed by Bertram Phillips
British silent feature films
British drama films
British black-and-white films
1910s British films
Silent drama films